William Theophilus Brown (April 7, 1919 – February 8, 2012) was an American artist.  He became prominent as a member of the Bay Area Figurative Movement.

Background and career
A descendant of early-American intellectuals, Brown was born in Moline, Illinois.  His great-grandfather was friends with Ralph Waldo Emerson and Henry David Thoreau. 
Brown's father was an inventor and  chief designer, at the John Deere Company in Moline, Illinois.
While attending Yale University in the late-1930s, Brown met composer Paul Hindemith and poet May Sarton, with whom he would share lifetime friendships. 
After graduating in 1941, Brown was drafted in World War II. 
Following his discharge, he began to study painting, moving between New York City and Paris, meeting an impressive range of artists that included Pablo Picasso, Braque, Giacometti, Balthus, and de Kooning, among others. 
Brown, who studied piano at Yale, was also close to a number of composers, including John Cage, Poulenc, Samuel Barber, and Igor Stravinsky.

In 1952 Brown enrolled in the graduate studio program at the University of California, Berkeley, joining a group of artists—including Richard Diebenkorn, David Park, Elmer Bischoff, James Weeks, and Nathan Oliveira — that would later be known as the Bay Area Figurative Movement. While attending Berkeley, Brown also met and fell in love with his long-time partner and fellow-painter, Paul Wonner.

In the early 1960s, Brown and Wonner moved to Santa Monica, where they developed a close friendship with fellow gay couple, novelist Christopher Isherwood, and portrait artist Don Bachardy. Over the years, Brown and Wonner also fostered friendships with playwright William Inge, composer and conductor André Previn, actress Eva Marie Saint and her husband, director Jeffery Hayden, and New Zealand novelist Janet Frame.

In his later years, Brown still managed to paint daily. Theophilus Brown resided in San Francisco, California at the time of his death.

His papers are held at the Archives of American Art.

Four months before his death, Brown gave  in which he fact-checked his Wikipedia entry. He found the entry accurate, on the whole, but termed his classification as an abstract expressionist "horseshit."  He died in San Francisco, aged 92.

Selected collections
Oakland Museum of California

Exhibitions
2011
Minnesota Marine Art Museum 
2005
Sacramento State University 
1996
Stanford Art Gallery

Sources
 Jones, Caroline A., Bay Area Figurative Art 1950-1956, Berkeley, University of California Press, 1990.
 Arthur, John., Theophilus Brown: Paintings, Collages and Drawings, Chesterfield: Chameleon, 2007, 
McCarthy, David, "Social Nudism, Masculinity, and the Male Nude in the Work of William Theo Brown and Wynn Chamberlain in the 1960s", Archives of American Art Journal 38, nos. 1–2 (1998), 28–38

References

External links
 An exhibit at the Wiegand Gallery in 1999.
 Oral history interview with William T. Brown, 2010

American abstract artists
Abstract painters
Abstract expressionist artists
American Expressionist painters
American Figurative Expressionism
1919 births
2012 deaths
American gay artists
LGBT people from Illinois
Painters from California
San Francisco Art Institute alumni
People from Moline, Illinois
Painters from Illinois
20th-century American painters
American male painters
21st-century American painters
American expatriates in France
20th-century American male artists